Luís Edgar Fernandes Abreu (born 16 February 1994) is a Portuguese professional footballer who plays for Lusitânia F.C. as a midfielder.

Club career
Abreu was born in Funchal, Madeira. A product of local C.D. Nacional's youth academy, he made his senior debut with third division club SC Mirandela on loan.

Having returned to Nacional, Abreu first appeared in the Primeira Liga on 26 October 2014, coming on as a late substitute in the 1–0 home win against Académica de Coimbra. He scored his first goal in the competition on 9 November, but in a 1–2 loss to S.L. Benfica also at the Estádio da Madeira.

Abreu was also loaned in the following two seasons, to U.D. Leiria and S.C. Olhanense (the first team competed in the third tier, the second in the Segunda Liga).

References

External links

1994 births
Living people
Sportspeople from Funchal
Portuguese footballers
Madeiran footballers
Association football midfielders
Primeira Liga players
Liga Portugal 2 players
Campeonato de Portugal (league) players
C.D. Nacional players
SC Mirandela players
U.D. Leiria players
S.C. Olhanense players
S.C. Espinho players
Académico de Viseu F.C. players
Lusitânia F.C. players